Ealey Glacier is a glacier, flowing northeast from the lower slopes of the Big Ben massif to the northeast side of Heard Island in the southern Indian Ocean. Its terminus is located close southeast of Cape Bidlingmaier, between Melbourne Bluff and North Barrier. The glacier terminates in ice cliffs. To the southeast of Ealey Glacier is Compton Glacier, whose terminus is located at Compton Lagoon, between Gilchrist Beach and Fairchild Beach. To the west of Ealey Glacier is Downes Glacier, whose terminus is located at Mechanics Bay, between Saddle Point and Cape Bidlingmaier.

Discovery and naming
Ealey Glacier is named after E. H. M. Ealey, biologist on the 1949 ANARE Heard Island Expedition who crossed the glacier during a biological survey en route to Spit Point.

References

Further reading

External links
Click here to see a map of Heard Island and McDonald Islands, including all major topographical features
Australian Antarctic Division
Australian Antarctic Gazetteer
Composite Gazetteer of Antarctica
Australian Antarctic Names and Medals Committee (AANMC)
United States Geological Survey, Geographic Names Information System (GNIS)
Scientific Committee on Antarctic Research (SCAR)

Glaciers of Heard Island and McDonald Islands